Carlos João Pinho Coelho (born 10 April 1953 in Lisbon) is a former Portuguese footballer who played as a defender.

External links 
 
 
 

1953 births
Living people
Portuguese footballers
Association football defenders
Primeira Liga players
S.C. Espinho players
Portimonense S.C. players
Portugal international footballers
Footballers from Lisbon